Abu l-Hassan ibn al-Khabbaza (died 1239) was a qadi, historian and poet active during the reign of the Almohad Sultan Abu al-Ala Idris al-Mamun (r. 1227–32)  in Seville, al-Andalus and Marrakesh, Morocco. When the last sultan of this dynasty left Iberia in 1228, Al-Khabazza joined him. Al-Khabazza was also the author of poems and a bio-bibliographic work.

Poetry
A few lines from his poem entitled "The King Who Died Young":

Your life was of the order true

Of Arab eloquence:

The tale was brief, the words were few;

The meaning was immense.

References

Ildefonso Garijo Galán, Jorge Lirola Delgado, Vicente Carlos Navarro Oltra: "Ibn al-Jabbaza, Abu L-Hasan." Biblioteca de al-Andalus: de IBN al-Dabbag a IBN Kurz. Almería, Spain. Ed.: Fundación IBN Tufayl de Estudios Árabes.  Vol. 1 Pag. 546-547. 2004   
"Ibn al-Khabbaza", p. 21 in: Moorish Poetry: A translation of the Pennants, an Anthology Compiled in 1243 by the Andalusian Ibn Said, Routledge 2001 

13th-century Moroccan historians
13th-century Moroccan poets
1239 deaths
People from Marrakesh
13th-century Moroccan judges
12th-century Moroccan historians
Year of birth unknown